Yogev Hazuharoui (born October 20, 1991) is an Israeli footballer who plays for F.C. Kafr Qasim.

References

1991 births
Living people
Israeli Jews
Israeli footballers
Hapoel Tel Aviv F.C. players
Hapoel Tzafririm Holon F.C. players
Hapoel Herzliya F.C. players
Hapoel Ra'anana A.F.C. players
Hapoel Katamon Jerusalem F.C. players
Hapoel Ironi Kiryat Shmona F.C. players
Hapoel Nir Ramat HaSharon F.C. players
F.C. Kafr Qasim players
Israeli Premier League players
Liga Leumit players
Footballers from Central District (Israel)
Israeli people of Polish-Jewish descent
Association football defenders